Alfred Gardner Wilmore (November 15, 1924 – March 3, 1996), nicknamed "Apples", was an American Negro league pitcher for the Philadelphia Stars and Baltimore Elite Giants between 1946 and 1950.

A native of Philadelphia, Pennsylvania, Wilmore attended Benjamin Franklin High School. He acquired his nickname as a child, preferring to spend his money on apples rather than candy, and then eating the entire apple. Wilmore served in the US Army during World War II. After returning from war, he spent several seasons in the Negro leagues, and was selected to play in the 1949 East–West All-Star Game as a member of the Baltimore Elite Giants. Wilmore was signed by the Philadelphia Athletics in 1952, and played for the minor league Lincoln A's, but did not reach the major league level.

Wilmore died in Philadelphia in 1996 at age 71.

References

External links
 and Seamheads
 Al "Apples" Wilmore at Negro League Baseball Players Association

1924 births
1996 deaths
Baltimore Elite Giants players
Philadelphia Stars players
Baseball pitchers
Baseball players from Philadelphia
United States Army personnel of World War II
Lincoln A's players
20th-century African-American sportspeople